The Turbomeca Artouste is an early French turboshaft engine, first run in 1947. Originally conceived as an auxiliary power unit (APU), it was soon adapted to aircraft propulsion, and found a niche as a powerplant for turboshaft-driven helicopters in the 1950s. Artoustes were licence-built by Bristol Siddeley (formerly Blackburn) in the UK, Hindustan Aeronautics Limited in India, and developed by Continental CAE in the US as the Continental T51. Two major versions of the Artouste were produced.

Variants
Artouste I
Artouste II
Artouste IIB, IIB1 for takeoff,  continuous
Artouste IIC, IIC1, IIC2, IIC5, IIC6 for takeoff,  continuous (limited by engine gearbox)
Artouste IIIB for takeoff,  continuous (limited by engine gearbox)
Artouste IIIB1, IIID for takeoff,  continuous (limited by engine gearbox)
Continental T51Licence production and development of the Artouste in the United States
Turbomeca MarcadauA turboprop variant, the Marcadau was a development of the Artouste II, producing  through a 2.3:1 reduction gearbox.

Applications
Artouste
Aérospatiale Alouette II
Aérospatiale Alouette III
Aerospatiale Lama
Aerotécnica AC-14
Atlas XH-1 Alpha
Curtiss-Wright VZ-7
Handley Page Victor - as APU
Hawker Siddeley Trident - as APU
IAR 316
IAR 317
Merckle SM 67
Nord Norelfe
Piasecki VZ-8 Airgeep
SNCASO Farfadet
Vickers VC10 - as APU

Marcadau
Morane-Saulnier Epervier

Engines on display
A Turbomeca Artouste is on public display at:

The Helicopter Museum (Weston)
  Aviodrome - Lelystad Airport - The Netherlands

Specifications (Artouste IIIB)

See also

References

Notes

Bibliography
 

1940s turboshaft engines
Artouste
Aircraft auxiliary power units